Steve Gravestock is a Canadian film festival programmer, best known as a longtime programmer for the Toronto International Film Festival.

Formerly a freelance film critic for various Toronto magazines and newspapers, he first joined TIFF's programming staff in 1994. He became the head programmer for Canadian films in 2004, also retaining responsibility for programming Nordic and Scandinavian films. In this role, he also played a key role in organizing and conducting the festival's annual Canada's Top Ten poll to identify the best Canadian films of the year, and coordinated the festival's series of monographs on Canadian film history.

He was the writer of Don Owen: Notes on the Filmmaker and His Culture, the TIFF monograph on Don Owen, and of a 2019 book on the history of Icelandic film.

He announced in 2022 that he would retire from the festival at the end of the year, with the 2022 Toronto International Film Festival being the last edition to feature his programming selections. As his last major project with TIFF, he programmed Seen the North, a special "carte blanche" screening series held at the TIFF Bell Lightbox in January 2023, which highlighted some of his own personal favourite films that he had programmed during his career with the festival. 

He was also named as the winner of the Toronto Film Critics Association's Company 3 TFCA Luminary Award at the Toronto Film Critics Association Awards 2022.

References

21st-century Canadian non-fiction writers
21st-century Canadian male writers
Canadian male non-fiction writers
Canadian film historians
Canadian film critics
Toronto International Film Festival people
Living people